Dayaldas Kurre (born 15 September 1923) was an Indian politician. He was a Member of Parliament, representing Madhya  Pradesh in the Rajya Sabha the upper house of India's Parliament as a member of the Indian National Congress.

References

1923 births
Possibly living people
Indian National Congress politicians from Madhya Pradesh
Rajya Sabha members from Madhya  Pradesh